Athens of the North may refer to one of several cities in Northern Europe that, due to their prominence in science and culture, were likened to Classical Athens:

 A nickname for Edinburgh, Scotland, see: Etymology of Edinburgh
 A nickname for Huddersfield, England
 A nickname for Jyväskylä, Finland, and especially the University of Jyväskylä
 The motto of King's Cove, Newfoundland and Labrador, Canada
 A nickname for Liège, Belgium, especially during the Prince-Bishopric of Liège
 A nickname for Stockholm, Sweden, especially in the time of Christina, Queen of Sweden
 A nickname for Valenciennes, France
 A nickname for Vilnius, Lithuania
 A nickname for the 18th-century Warrington Academy, in England

See also 
 North Athens (regional unit), an administrative division in Athens, Greece